Prosťáček is a 1945 Czechoslovak drama film directed by Karel Steklý.

Cast
 František Filipovský as Tramp
 Vladimír Repa as Tramp - Thief
 Milada Smolíková as The lady of the house
 Nadezda Vladyková as Maid Barunka
 Bedrich Bozdech as Policeman
 Eliska Kucharová as Daughter Anicka
 Josef Pehr as Man in carnival dress

References

External links
 

1945 films
1945 drama films
Czech drama films
Czechoslovak drama films
1940s Czech-language films
Czech black-and-white films
Czechoslovak black-and-white films
Films directed by Karel Steklý
1945 directorial debut films
1940s Czech films